39th parallel may refer to:

39th parallel north, a circle of latitude in the Northern Hemisphere
39th parallel south, a circle of latitude in the Southern Hemisphere